The 1989 CART PPG Indy Car World Series season was the 11th national championship season of American open wheel racing sanctioned by CART. The season consisted of 15 races, and one non-points exhibition event. Emerson Fittipaldi was the national champion, and the rookie of the year was Bernard Jourdain. Fittipaldi became the second driver after Mario Andretti to win the Formula One World Championship and the CART championship.

The 1989 Indianapolis 500 was sanctioned by USAC, but counted towards the CART points championship. Emerson Fittipaldi won the Indy 500, and would later become the first driver since Bobby Rahal in 1986 to win Indy and the CART championship in the same season.

Emerson Fittipaldi won a total of five races, four pole positions, and had a total of eight podium finishes en route to the championship. Rick Mears won three races, and had a total of 14 top ten finishes, more consistent than Fittipaldi. The championship battle came down to those two drivers. In the second-to-last race of the season at Nazareth, Fittipaldi and Mears finished 1st-2nd. Fittipaldi effectively clinched the championship by virtue of a now 22-point lead over Mears. If Mears were to win the season finale at Laguna Seca, win the pole, and lead the most laps, he could tie Fittipaldi in points if Fittipaldi finished 13th or worse. However, Fittipaldi held the tiebreaker with 5 wins versus Mears with 3. Mears did all three at Laguna Seca (won the pole, won the race and led the most laps), but the tiebreaker scenario was moot as Fittipaldi managed a 5th place in the race. It was Mears' first road course victory since Riverside in 1982, and the first since he suffered serious leg injuries in 1984. It was also the last road course win of his career.

At Mid-Ohio, Teo Fabi scored the first and only win of the Porsche Indy Car team. Fabi had eleven top tens, and finished 4th in points. Cosworth unveiled a new engine, the "short-stroke" DFS to some fanfare, but little success. Bobby Rahal won one race in 1989 with the Cosworth DFS in July at the Meadowlands. It would stand as the only race victory for the DFS powerplant.

Drivers and constructors 
The following teams and drivers competed for the 1989 Indy Car World Series. All entries utilized Goodyear tires.

Season Summary

Schedule
Since Miami was dropped from the schedule the season finale and the Marlboro Challenge was moved to Laguna Seca.

- Meadowlands was supposed to run for 183 miles (295 kilometers) but was shortened due to rain.
 Oval/Speedway
 Dedicated road course
 Temporary street circuit
NC Non-championship event

Race results 

Indianapolis was USAC-sanctioned but counted towards the CART title.

Final driver standings

Nation's Cup 

 Top result per race counts towards Nation's Cup.

Chassis Constructor's Cup

Engine Manufacturer's Cup

See also
 1989 Indianapolis 500
 1989 American Racing Series season

References
 
 
 
 
 

Champ Car seasons
IndyCar